Shiru Kandi (also Romanized as Shīrū Kandī; also known as Sherekand and Shere-Kendy) is a village in Baranduzchay-ye Jonubi Rural District, in the Central District of Urmia County, West Azerbaijan Province, Iran. At the 2006 census, its population was 112, in 22 families.

References 

Populated places in Urmia County